Muzeum Susch is a private art museum located in the town of Susch, Switzerland, which focuses on collecting and promoting the work of female modern and contemporary artists. Founded by the Polish entrepreneur and art collector Grażyna Kulczyk, Muzeum Susch opened on January 2, 2019. Its name uses the original Polish spelling of the word museum.

Location 
With a population of just over 200 people, Susch is 1438 meters (4,718 feet) above sea level, in the Lower Engadine valley, in the canton of Graubünden, Switzerland. The Lower Engadine valley contains towns such as St. Moritz and Davos. The museum can be easily accessed via the Swiss Federal Railways; the nearest railway station is Susch, 350 meters away.

History

Monastery 
The buildings that make up Muzeum Susch were part of a rural monastery founded in 1157. The monastery was on the pilgrims' path to Rome and Santiago de Compostela called Jacob's trail. The buildings consisted of a vicarage, hospice and economic building. In the 19th century a brewery building was added.

Redevelopment 
Grażyna Kulczyk acquired the museum building and three other old Engadine houses on the same street and commissioned the architect duo Chasper Schmidlin and Lukas Voellmy to develop the Muzeum Susch project from the complex. Since all buildings are under cantonal monument protection, an extension of the exhibition space was only possible inside the mountain, while the existing structures were subtly restored and recombined. In the first construction phase, 9000 tons of rock were blasted out, and the cavernous rooms in the mountain were designed. The raw stone was left in some rooms, making it possible to experience the mountain's insides; in one room, you can see how spring water emerges from the rock. The amphibolite rock was blown up, ground up and reused as polished floor covering. Other floors are made of local stone pine, pebbles from the Inn or limestone slabs used in the previous buildings. The renovation took three years. Today, the exhibition area covers 1500 square meters on four floors in around twenty rooms arranged like a labyrinth and differently designed.

Opening 
The gallery opened on 2 January 2019

Building and exhibition space 

The whole museum complex consists of four buildings: the Bieraria (brewery), the Bieraria Veglia (old brewery), the Chasa Della Santa (House of Health) and the Artist House. The entrance to the Museum is through the basement of the Bieraria. The Bieraria Veglia is accessed through a pre-existing underground passage, where exhibition space and the headquarters of the Muzeum Susch/Art Stations Foundation CH are housed.

The space draws a connection to nature, and was built to encourage an exploratory, slow art journey introducing spaces for exhibitions and experimental presentations, performances, conferences, lectures and events, as well as an interdisciplinary residency programme.

In summer, terraced gardens designed by landscape architect Günther Vogt can be accessed from the exhibition rooms.

Exhibition 
The exhibits inside the building consist of permanent installations and seasonal exhibitions.

Permanent site-specific installations 
Muzeum Susch consists of a series of permanent, site-specific installations by international contemporary artists. The installations engage with the architecture and the characteristic structure.

Each of the permanent installations plays a part in shaping the evolving character and distinctive layout of the space, inviting a unique sense of choreography with temporary works on display that will occupy most of the building space.  

Monika Sosnowska’s 'Stairs' (2017), a 14m steel spinal column structure, was one of the first site-specific works to arrive at Muzeum Susch, and it sits in the former ice tower of the brewery.

Other permanent site-specific installations include: Narcissussusch (2018) by Mirosław Bałka, Midada da structura (2018) by Mirko Baselgia, Herrenzimmer (1977 – 1979) by Heidi Bucher, Piss Flowers, 1991–1992 by Helen Chadwick, Dreams in Black I (1992) and Dreams in Black II (1994) by Izabella Gustowska, Flock I (1990) by Magdalena Abakanowicz, Ethnic Wars. Large Vanitas Still Life (1995/2017) by Zofia Kulik, Inn Reverse (2018) by Sara Masüger, Painkillers (2014 – 2017) by Joanna Rajkowska, Real Nazis (2017) & Untitled (Story of the Eye, 2013) by Piotr Uklański, From the Series The Theater of Disappearance XXXI (2018) by Adrián Villar Rojas, Tuor per Susch (Tower for Susch), 2020] by Not Vital and Listening by Eye by Jarosław Kozłowski.

Temporary exhibitions

Other programmes

Acziun Susch 

Created and curated by Joanna Lesnierowska, Acziun Susch is a research and presentation platform bringing forward the art of choreography in dialogue with other disciplines and providing the dance community with a meeting point in the Swiss Alps.

The programme of research residencies combines space for reflection and individual practice with public rehearsals, workshops and lectures.

Magazine Susch 
Annual Magazine Susch serving as an additional thought-provoking platform - Muzeum Susch/Acziun Susch supported publishing this book, offered Cools a residence to continue his research on laments in modern art, and commissioned a podcast on the subject for their 2020 series Echolot.

Echolot podcast 
Echolot is a podcast in which creatives reflect on and the concepts of taking life at an intentionally slower pace with increased time for contemplation during their time at Muzeum Susch.

Art Stations Foundation CH 
Art station foundation is a foundation funded by Grarzyna Kulczyk which supports the Muzeum. Since 2004 Art Stations Foundation by Grażyna Kulczyk has been providing extensive support to the development of contemporary choreography through its performative programme based in Poznań, recognized internationally under the name Stary Browar Nowy Taniec / Old Brewery New Dance.

References 

Museums in Switzerland
2019 establishments in Switzerland
Buildings and structures completed in 2019
Contemporary art galleries in Switzerland
Modern art museums
21st-century architecture in Switzerland